"Forever Marshall Islands", also known by its incipit, "" ("Our Islands"), is the national anthem of the Marshall Islands. The lyrics were written by former President Amata Kabua, and the music was composed by Korean composer Gil ok-yun (also known by his Japanese name, Jun Yoshiya, 吉屋潤) by the request of President Kabua. The song was finished and recorded at Oasis Records in Seoul. Kabua and Gil became acquaintances after Jiyong (池勇), an economic adviser for President Amata Kabua, introduced Gil Ok Yun to Kabua.

The anthem was adopted in 1991. It replaced a previous national anthem, "".

Lyrics

Notes

References

External links 
Streaming audio of Forever Marshall Islands, with lyrics and information (archive link)
 Sheet music of the anthem (in PDF format) 
Listen to an instrumental version of Forever Marshall Islands  (mp3)

Oceanian anthems
National symbols of the Marshall Islands
Marshallese music
National anthems
National anthem compositions in C major